Sidney Anders Rand (May 9, 1916 – December 16, 2003) was an American Lutheran minister,  educator and college president. He served under the Carter administration as United States Ambassador to Norway from 1980 to 1981.

Background
Rand was born in Eldred, Minnesota, to Charles W. and Alice Pedersen Rand. He lived in Beltrami and Williams, Minnesota, where his father was Superintendent of Schools. Following his father's death in 1920, the family moved to Rothsay, Minnesota, his mother's hometown. He graduated in 1938 from Concordia College, was ordained at the Lutheran Seminary in St. Paul in 1943 and served as a pastor in northern Minnesota.

Career
Rand joined the Concordia College faculty in 1945. He was president of Waldorf College in Forest City, Iowa, from 1951 to 1956, when he became executive director of college education for the Evangelical Lutheran Church in Minneapolis. In July 1963, he became President of St. Olaf College, Northfield, Minnesota and served in that capacity until February, 1980, at which time he became United States Ambassador to Norway. The Norwegian government recognized  Ambassador Rand for his services in promoting good relations between the two countries. He was awarded the Knight First Class — Order of St. Olav and the Commander of the Royal Norwegian Order of Merit.

He retired in Minneapolis during 1981. He later taught part-time at Luther Seminary in St. Paul and served as a consultant to colleges on management studies. He served as interim President of two colleges, Augustana College, Sioux Falls, South Dakota (1986–87 and 1992–93) and Suomi College (now Finlandia University), Hancock, Michigan (1990–91). Rand was a member of the
Norwegian-American Historical Association and was inducted into the Scandinavian-American Hall of Fame at the 1987 Norsk Hostfest in Minot, N.D.

Rand Scholar Award
The Rand Scholar Award was established at St. Olaf College. it was named in honor of former college president Sidney Anders Rand.

References

1916 births
2003 deaths
Ambassadors of the United States to Norway
Concordia College (Moorhead, Minnesota) alumni
Finlandia University
People from Polk County, Minnesota
St. Olaf College people
Waldorf University
Heads of universities and colleges in the United States
Recipients of the St. Olav's Medal
American people of Norwegian descent
20th-century American academics